Albin Gashi (born 24 January 1997) is an Austrian professional footballer who plays as an attacking midfielder for 2. Liga club SV Horn.

Club career

Rapid Wien II
On 1 March 2014, Gashi made his debut with Rapid Wien II in Matchday 16 of 2013–14 Austrian Regionalliga against Wiener Viktoria after coming on as a substitute at 76th minute in place of Ferdinand Weinwurm.

Loan at Floridsdorfer
On 4 July 2017, Gashi joined Austrian Football Second League side Floridsdorfer, on a season-long loan. Ten days later, he made his debut with Floridsdorfer in the first round of 2017–18 Austrian Cup against SV Horn after being named in the starting line-up.

Loan at Den Bosch
On 14 August 2018, Gashi joined Eerste Divisie side Den Bosch, on a season-long loan. Ten days later, he made his debut in a 2–3 home defeat against RKC Waalwijk after coming on as a substitute at 74th minute in place of Sven Blummel.

Loan at SV Horn
On 24 January 2019, Gashi joined Austrian Football Second League side SV Horn, on a season-long loan. One month later, he made his debut in a 4–0 away defeat against Liefering after being named in the starting line-up.

Return to Floridsdorfer
On 16 July 2019, Gashi returned to Austrian Football Second League side Floridsdorfer. Four days later, he made his debut with Floridsdorfer in the first round of 2019–20 Austrian Cup against FC Wolfurt after coming on as a substitute at 46th minute in place of Martin Pajaczkowski.

Kukësi
On 4 August 2020, Gashi signed a two-year contract with Kategoria Superiore club Kukësi, to replace the departed Kristal Abazaj as the second choice. On 27 August 2020, he made his debut with Kukësi in the 2020–21 UEFA Europa League first qualifying round match against the Bulgarian side Slavia Sofia after coming on as a substitute at 46th minute in place of Enis Gavazaj.

Return to SV Horn
On 24 January 2022, Gashi signed a one-and-a-half-year contract with SV Horn.

International career

From 2012, until 2016, Gashi has been part of Austria at youth international level, respectively has been part of the U16, U17, U18 and U19 teams and he with these teams played 36 matches and scored 8 goals. On 1 July 2016, he was named as part of the Austria U19's 18-man squad for the 2016 UEFA European Under-19 Championship in Germany.

References

External links

1997 births
Living people
People from Hollabrunn
Austrian footballers
Austria youth international footballers
Austrian people of Kosovan descent
Austrian people of Albanian descent
Austrian expatriate sportspeople
Austrian expatriate sportspeople in the Netherlands
Kosovan expatriate sportspeople in Albania
Kosovan footballers
Kosovan expatriate sportspeople
Kosovan expatriate sportspeople in Austria
Kosovan expatriate sportspeople in the Netherlands
Association football midfielders
Austrian Regionalliga players
2. Liga (Austria) players
Floridsdorfer AC players
FC Den Bosch players
Eerste Divisie players
SV Horn players
Kategoria Superiore players
FK Kukësi players
Footballers from Lower Austria